The 2007–08 Atlanta Thrashers season began on October 5, 2007. It was the Atlanta Thrashers' ninth season in the National Hockey League (NHL).

Key dates prior to the start of the season:

The 2007 NHL Entry Draft took place in Columbus, Ohio, on June 22–23.
The free agency period began on July 1.

Regular season
Starting off 0–6–0, the Thrashers fired head coach Bob Hartley on October 17, 2007, replacing him on an interim basis with general manager Don Waddell.

On December 23, 2007, Marian Hossa scored just 19 seconds into overtime to give Atlanta a 3–2 road win over the St. Louis Blues. Hossa tied Martin Erat, who also scored 15 seconds into the overtime period of the Predators' November 15, 2007, 5–4 home win over the Chicago Blackhawks, for the fastest overtime goal of the 2007–08 regular season.

Excluding six shootout goals, the Thrashers allowed 266 goals, tied with the Tampa Bay Lightning for the most in the NHL.

Divisional standings

Conference standings

Schedule and results

October

Record: 4–8–0; Home: 1–3–0; Road: 3–5–0

November

Record: 7–5–0; Home: 3–3–0; Road: 4–2–0

December

Record: 8–7–1; Home: 6–3–0; Road: 2–4–1

January

Record: 5–4–3; Home: 3–2–2; Road: 2–2–1

February

Record: 4–6–2; Home: 3–3–0; Road: 1–4–2

March

Record:2–4–2; Home:2–3–0; Road:0–1–3

April

Record:1-1-0; Home:1-1-0; Road:0-0-0

Playoffs
A year after winning the Southeast Division, the Thrashers failed to qualify for the playoffs.

Skaters
Note: GP = Games played; G = Goals; A = Assists; Pts = Points; PIM = Penalty minutes

Goaltenders
Note: GP = Games played; TOI = Time on ice (minutes); W = Wins; L = Losses; OT = Overtime/shootout losses; GA = Goals against; SO = Shutouts; SV% = Save percentage; GAA = Goals against average

Awards and records

Records

Milestones

Transactions
The Thrashers have been involved in the following transactions during the 2007–08 season.

Trades

Free agents

Draft picks
Atlanta's picks at the 2007 NHL Entry Draft in Columbus, Ohio.

Atlanta will pick third in the 2008 NHL Entry Draft, behind the Tampa Bay Lightning and Los Angeles Kings, after failing to move up in the draft lottery. The Thrashers will also have the first round pick from the Pittsburgh Penguins, received in the trade for Marian Hossa.

Farm teams

American Hockey League
The Chicago Wolves are the Thrashers American Hockey League affiliate for the 2007–08 AHL season

ECHL
The Gwinnett Gladiators are the Thrashers ECHL affiliate.

See also
2007–08 NHL season

References

 

Atlanta Thrashers seasons
Atlanta Thrashers season, 2007-08
National Hockey League All-Star Game hosts
Atlanta Thrashers
Atlanta Thrashers